The Wrentham Village Premium Outlets is an open-air outlet power center owned by the Simon Property Group. It is located off I-495 and Route 1A in Wrentham, Massachusetts. The facility opened in 1997, and was expanded in 1998, 1999, and 2000. With  and 170 retailers, it has been credited as the reason for the downfall of the nearby, smaller Worcester Common Outlets, which closed in 2006, as well as the Cape Cod Factory Outlet Mall, which closed in 2011. In September 2018, the Simon Property Group began a multiphase and multimillion-dollar renovation of the center.

Major brands
The Wrentham Outlets are home to 170 stores, some of the top brands include:
American Eagle Outfitters
Banana Republic
Brooks Brothers
Calvin Klein
Coach Outlet
Gap
GUCCI
Kate Spade New York
lululemon
Michael Kors
Nautica
Nike
 Polo Ralph Lauren Factory Store
Saks Off 5th
Tommy Hilfiger
Under Armour
Vineyard Vines

2018-2020 renovation project
In September 2018, the Simon Property Group began a renovation of the center. The project, which is set to be completed by the end of 2019, will include new landscaping and lighting, signage, digital directories, and other improvements. As of March 2020, work on Wrentham St, Colonial Court, Heritage Court, and Liberty Court has been completed. Work is currently underway on Patriot Court and Freedom Court and work is ongoing throughout the center.

References

1997 establishments in Massachusetts
Buildings and structures in Norfolk County, Massachusetts
Shopping malls established in 1997
Shopping malls in Massachusetts
Premium Outlets